Stevenage Football Club is an English association football club based in Stevenage, Hertfordshire. The team competes in League Two, the fourth tier of English football. The most recent appointment was that of Steve Evans, who was appointed as the club's manager in March 2022.

There have been 17 permanent managers of Stevenage since the club's formation in 1976. Victor Folbigg was the first manager of the newly formed team, although the club had not taken on senior status during his tenure. Derek Montgomery, who was already part of the management team, was appointed as the club's first manager at senior level and he oversaw the club's transition from intermediate to senior status in 1980. Paul Fairclough has had the longest tenure of any Stevenage manager, spending eight years and six months as manager between 1990 and 1998. Fairclough led the club to three promotions in his first four years in charge, as well as winning the Conference National during the 1995–96 season, although the club were ultimately denied promotion. 

Stevenage became the first team to win a competitive match at the new Wembley Stadium when they won the FA Trophy under Mark Stimson's management in 2007. It was the first time the club had won a national cup competition. Graham Westley, who was serving his second of four spells as manager, was the club's first manager in the Football League having guided Stevenage to the Conference Premier title in the 2009–10 season. The spell would prove to be his most fruitful; adding an FA Trophy triumph in 2009 and promotion via the play-offs into League One to his honours list.

The following list details the statistical record of the managers and any honours or promotions they achieved. This chronological list comprises all those who have held the position of manager of the first team of Stevenage. Each manager's entry includes his dates of tenure and the club's overall competitive record, in terms of matches won, drawn and lost, honours won and significant achievements while under his care. Caretaker managers are included, as well as those who have been in permanent charge.

Managerial history

1976–1990
The club was formed in 1976 following the demise of the town's former club, Stevenage Athletic. Prior to the club taking on senior status, the newly formed club was first managed by Victor Folbigg. Folbigg helped the team to win two Eastern Counties Youth Cup titles during his time as manager. Folbigg was replaced by Derek Montgomery in 1979, who was already a part of the existing management team. Montgomery would oversee the club's transition from intermediate to senior status, and he was manager for the club's first senior match in the United Counties League in 1980. He helped guide the club to the United Counties League Division One championship, as well as the United Counties League Cup, in their first season.

Frank Cornwell took charge in July 1983. Cornwell was making the step up to first-team manager having joined the club during the 1982–83 season as reserve team manager. He remained as first-team manager for four years, guiding the team to the Isthmian League Division Two North title during the 1985–86 season. Cornwell tendered his resignation as manager ahead of the 1987–88 season after a poor end to the previous season. The club persuaded him to stay, but he ultimately resigned from the role in September 1987; a match-day programme at the time of his departure stated he had been a "victim of his own success". John Bailey was named as Cornwell's replacement, with the club being relegated back to the Isthmian Division Two North during his one season as manager. Brian Williams was tasked with steadying the club following the relegation; appointed as manager in July 1988. He spent two full seasons in charge, guiding Stevenage to two fourth-place finishes.

1990–2008
Paul Fairclough, departing from Hertford Town, was appointed as the club's manager in June 1990 and his arrival would ultimately prove to be a turning point in the club's history. The club won Division Two North during Fairclough's first season as manager, winning 34 of their 42 games, including every match played at home, scoring 122 goals and amassing 107 points. Back-to-back promotions were earned a year later as the team won the Isthmian League Division One title. Stevenage then won promotion to the Football Conference in 1994, meaning the club had been promoted three times in four seasons. Two seasons later, they won the Conference under Fairclough's management, but were denied promotion due to insufficient ground facilities. 

Fairclough remained as the club's manager until December 1998 having also guided the club to the first round of the FA Cup for the first time, as well as two well-documented FA Cup ties against Newcastle United during the 1997–98 season. He took charge for 509 matches during his first spell with the club, which is a club record for games managed in one spell. His win percentage of 56.58% is also the highest win percentage of any Stevenage manager. When Fairclough departed, Richard Hill took over the club in third place in the Conference. The club ultimately finished in sixth during the 1998–99 season. Hill was sacked in April 2000 following a poor run of form and Steve Wignall took charge for the remainder of the 2000–01 season. Wignall left the club after just eight games in order to become manager of Doncaster Rovers.

Following Wignall's departure, Fairclough returned for a second spell. He spent a year-and-a-half in charge before leaving midway through the 2001–02 season. Fairclough was replaced by Wayne Turner, who had previously been assistant manager at Peterborough United. Turner helped guide the club to the FA Trophy Final having taken over with the club at the quarter-final stage, where they would lose to Yeovil Town at Villa Park. With the club occupying last place in the Conference league table, Turner was sacked in December 2002. A month later, Graham Westley, who had been manager at Farnborough Town, was named as manager. Westley helped guide the club to safety having signed seven players from his former club. During his first spell, Westley came close to guiding the club to the Football League in the 2004–05 season, losing in the Conference play-off final to Carlisle United in May 2005. He left a year later when his contract expired.

Replacing Westley was Mark Stimson, who had left fellow Conference team Grays Athletic. Stimson had the team playing an attacking style of football and helped guide the club to their first honours in a decade when the team won the FA Trophy at the first competitive match at the new Wembley Stadium in May 2007. It was the first time that Stevenage had won a national cup competition. With the team towards the top of the Conference league table in the opening months of the 2007–08 season, Stimson left to join Gillingham. He was replaced by former England caretaker manager Peter Taylor, tasked with helping guide the club into the Football League. The club ultimately fell out of the play-off positions and Taylor left at the end of the season.

2008–
Westley returned for a second spell in May 2008. Whilst his appointment was met with scepticism by some Stevenage supporters, he stated he had come to "finish the job he started" – referring to trying to guide the club into the Football League for the first time in its history. Westley's first season back at the club started slowly, but a club record 24-match unbeaten run meant Stevenage made the play-offs, ultimately losing at the semi-final stage. That season, they won the FA Trophy, and the success was to signify the start of a successful period for the club. Westley guided Stevenage into the Football League after the team won the Conference Premier title during the 2009–10 season, also finishing as FA Trophy runners-up that season. It meant that Westley was Stevenage's first manager in the Football League. He helped guide the team to back-to-back promotions into League One after the club won promotion via the play-offs in May 2011. With the club in the League One play-off places in January 2012, Westley left to join divisional rivals Preston North End. Former Colorado Rapids manager Gary Smith was appointed as Westley's replacement later that month, helping the club reach the play-off semi-final that season. In doing so, he guided the club to their highest placed league finish.

Despite Stevenage being in the top six of League One midway through the 2012–13 season, a run of 14 losses from 18 matches from December 2012 meant the club were closer to the relegation places just three months later. Smith was subsequently sacked in March 2013 and replaced by Westley, returning for his third spell at the club. Stevenage were relegated back into League Two during the 2013–14 season after finishing in last place in League One. The team lost in the play-off semi-finals in their first season back in League Two. The club opted against offering Westley a new deal and replaced him with Teddy Sheringham, taking on his first managerial role. Sheringham was sacked in February 2016 with the club positioned in 19th. First-team coach Darren Sarll took caretaker charge for the remainder of the season and was given the role on a permanent basis after helping the club secure League Two safety. With Stevenage in 16th place during the 2017–18 season, Sarll was sacked in March 2018; Wallace stating the club "had not seen the progress expected" since making a number of signings during the January transfer window. Former player and first-team coach, Dino Maamria, replaced Sarll as manager. 

Stevenage started the 2019–20 season without a win in the opening month of the season and Maamria was subsequently sacked in September 2019. First-team coach Mark Sampson took caretaker charge, but with the club in 23rd-place after several months under his management, Westley returned for a fourth spell in December 2019. Two months later, Westley resigned, and was replaced by Alex Revell, who had previously assumed the role of player-coach at the club. Revell managed the club for 77 matches, with the club placing in 14th position in League Two in his one full season as manager. With Stevenage in 21st place three months into the 2021–22 season, Revell left the club. Paul Tisdale was appointed as manager on 29 November 2021. After winning three of his 21 matches as manager, Tisdale left the club on 16 March 2022. Steve Evans was appointed as the club's new manager on the same day. The club won four of their final nine matches under Evans to avoid relegation and finish in 21st position.

Managers
Information correct as of 1 March 2023. Competitive matches counted only. Caretaker managers are shown in italics.

References

External links

Stevenage F.C. official website

Managers
 
Stevenage